Absorption unit may refer to

Gray (unit), SI unit of absorbed radiation dose
Sabin (unit), unit of sound absorption
A device which absorbs, such as a Dynamometer

See also
Absorption (disambiguation)